The Mobjack is an American sailboat that was designed by Roger Moorman as a one design racer and first built in 1956.

The boat is named for Mobjack Bay, Virginia.

Production
The design was built by Mobjack Manufacturing in Gloucester, Virginia and Newport Boats in Newport, California, United States, among other builders. Production started in 1956 and ended in 2003 with 537 boats completed, but it is now out of production.

Design
The Mobjack is a recreational sailing dinghy, built predominantly of fiberglass, with wood trim. It has a fractional sloop rig, a plumb stem and transom, a transom-hung rudder controlled by a tiller and a folding centerboard. It displaces .

A single trapeze is normally used by the crew.

Operational history
The boat is supported by an active class club that organizes racing events, the International Mobjack Association.

See also
List of sailing boat types

References

External links

Dinghies
1950s sailboat type designs
Sailboat types built in the United States
Sailboat type designs by Roger Moorman
Sailboat types built by Newport Boats
Sailboat types built by Mobjack Manufacturing